Mikey Daniel (born November 3, 1996) is an American football running back. He played college football at South Dakota State.

Profesional career

Atlanta Falcons
Daniel signed with the Atlanta Falcons as an undrafted free agent following the 2020 NFL Draft on April 27, 2020. He was waived during final roster cuts on September 5.

Carolina Panthers
On April 13, 2021 Daniel was signed with the Carolina Panthers to fill in for Alex Armah. He was waived on August 10, 2021.

Pittsburgh Maulers
Daniel was signed on April 4, 2022, by the Pittsburgh Maulers. He was transferred to the team's inactive roster on May 6 with a head injury. He was moved back to the active roster on May 14. He was released after the season on January 2, 2023.

References

Further reading

 

1996 births
Living people
South Dakota State Jackrabbits football players
American football fullbacks
Atlanta Falcons players
Carolina Panthers players
Pittsburgh Maulers (2022) players
Players of American football from South Dakota
People from Brookings, South Dakota